Isabel (French variation, Isabelle) is a feminine given name. It is also a surname. 

Isabel or Isabelle may also refer to:

Film and television
 Isabel (film), a 1968 Canadian film
 Isabel (TV series), a Spanish historical fiction TV series based upon Queen Isabella I of Castile
 Isabel (The Office), a character in The Office

People 
 Isabel of Gloucester (c. 1173 – 1217)
 Saint Isabelle of France (1225–1270)
 Isabella of Aragon, Queen of France (1247–1271)
 Isabella of Aragon, Queen of Germany (1305–1330)
 Isabel of Majorca (1337–1406)
 Infanta Isabel, Duchess of Burgundy (1397–1471)
 Isabel of Coimbra (1432–1455), Queen Consort of Alphonse V of Portugal
 Isabel, Princess Imperial of Brazil (1846–1921)
 Isabel, a figure in the Book of Mormon
 Thibault Isabel (born 1978), French writer and publisher

Places

Philippines
 Isabel, Leyte
 Isabel Island (Philippines)

Solomon Islands
 Isabel Province

United States
 Isabel, Illinois
 Isabel, Kansas
 Isabel, North Dakota
 Isabel, South Dakota
 Point Isabel (disambiguation)
 Port Isabel, Texas

Ships
 Isabel (ship), a British Arctic-exploration vessel launched in 1850
 USS Isabel, a 1917 patrol boat in the U.S. Navy during World War I
 USS Falcon (1846) or Isabel, a Mexican gunboat captured by the U.S. Navy in 1846

Other uses 
 Isabel (bug), a genus of insects
 Isabel (crater)
 "Isabel" (Il Divo song), a 2005 song by Il Divo from Ancora
 Isabel naked-tailed rat, a rodent found in Papua New Guinea and the Solomon Islands

See also 
 Isabel Perón (born 1931), president of Argentina
 Isabela (disambiguation)
 Isabelita (disambiguation)
 Isabella (disambiguation)
 Isabelle (disambiguation)
 Isobel (disambiguation)
 List of storms named Isabel, several named storms
 Queen Isabella (disambiguation)
 Saint Isabel (disambiguation)
 Santa Isabel (disambiguation)
 Isabel of Portugal (disambiguation)